The Journal of Contingencies and Crisis Management (JCCM) is a multi-disciplinary, peer-reviewed academic journal that covers all theoretical and practical aspects relating to crisis management.

JCCM is the leading journal on the subject of crisis management. It was founded in 1993 by Prof. Uriel Rosenthal and Prof. Alexander Kouzmin (University of Plymouth). The current editor is Prof. Ira Helsloot (Radboud Universiteit Nijmegen).

Subject areas include: emergency management, risk management, contingency plans, foreign policies, ecological crisis, financial crisis, international relations, security policies, and conflict resolution.

JCCM is published by Wiley-Blackwell. Reviews from older issues are regularly re-published in the Political ReviewNet database.

References

External links
 Journal of Contingencies and Crisis Management homepage

International relations journals
Political science journals
Strategic management

Security
Crisis
Wiley-Blackwell academic journals